The 1993 Giro d'Italia,, was the 76th edition of the race. It started off in Porto Azzurro on 23 May with a split stage, with the first leg being a mass-start stage and the latter an individual time trial. The race ended on 13 June with a stage that stretched  from Biella to Milan. Twenty teams entered the race, which was won by Miguel Induráin of the  team. Second and third respectively were the Latvian Piotr Ugrumov and the Italian rider, Claudio Chiappucci. Indurain's victory in the 1993 Giro was his first step in completing the Giro – Tour double – winning the Giro d'Italia and Tour de France in one calendar year – becoming the first rider to repeat this feat in consecutive years.

Moreno Argentin was the first rider to wear the race leader's maglia rosa after winning the opening stage. Argentin held that lead for ten more days before losing it to Miguel Induráin after the conclusion stage 10. Bruno Leali stole the lead away from Indurain after the race's eleventh leg and held it until the end of the fourteenth day of racing. Indurain gained the lead after mountainous stage 14 and then held it all the way to the Giro's finish in Milan.

Indurain became the first Spanish rider to win the Giro d'Italia in consecutive years. Amongst the other classifications that the race awarded, Italian Adriano Baffi of  won the points competition, 's Claudio Chiappucci won the mountains classification, 's Pavel Tonkov completed the Giro as the best rider aged 25 or younger in the general classification, finishing fifth overall, and Ján Svorada of Lampre-Polti won the intergiro competition. Lampre-Polti finished as the winners of the team classification, ranking each of the twenty teams contesting the race by lowest cumulative time. Ariostea finished as winners of the team points classification.

Teams

Twenty teams were invited by the race organizers to participate in the 1993 edition of the Giro d'Italia, seven of which were based outside of Italy. Each team sent a squad of nine riders, which meant that the race started with a peloton of 180 cyclists. Italy (78), France (24), Spain (17), Germany (11), and Colombia (10) all had more than 10 riders. Of these, 69 were riding the Giro d'Italia for the first time. The average age of riders was 27.69 years, ranging from 21–year–old Alexandr Shefer to 35–year–old Bruno Leali. From the riders that began the race, 132 made it to the finish in Milan.

The teams that took part in the race were:

Pre-race favorites

The starting peloton included the 1992 winner, Miguel Induráin, who had not had a successful start to his 1993 campaign. He hoped to repeat as winner of the Giro and the Tour for the second consecutive year, stating "My main objective remains the Tour de France, but I will still try to win the Giro." If Indurain would win the two Grand Tours in the season, he would be the fourth rider to accomplish winning the Giro and Tour in one season twice in their career. Despite this, Indurain was viewed as the favorite to win the general classification. Maurizio Fondriest was thought to have entered in peak form after winning several races in the spring campaign, including Milan–San Remo and Tirreno–Adriatico. El Mundo Deportivo writer Javier de Dalmases believed Fondirest would be the first rider to don the race leader's maglia rosa. Indurain felt Fondriest was the rider to watch in the race's first week.

Gianni Bugno, who won the race in 1990, prepared at lengths for the race and was seen as a threat in the time trial stages. Bugno won only one race before the Giro started, the Grand Prix Gippingen earlier in May, but was thought to have a strong showing at the Amstel Gold Race. Author Bill McGann dismissed Bugno saying that his ability to "win at will" had passed. With no victories in the season, 1991 winner and 3rd-place finisher in 1992, Franco Chioccioli was considered a dark–horse contender. Other favorites named for the race included Pavel Tonkov and 1988 winner Andrew Hampsten as contenders for the overall crown. Claudio Chiappucci was thought to be the one of the most potent climbers in the race. Specifically, a L'Express writer commented that Chiappucci's performance on the Sestriere time trial in the 1992 Tour de France as an example of his climbing prowess. In addition, he had several second-place finishes in the Giro and Tour the previous year.

Famed sprinters Mario Cipollini and Djamolidine Abdoujaparov did not compete in the race, while Dutch sprinter Jean-Paul van Poppel was going to race in the Giro but was left off the roster before it started. With the aforementioned riders' absence, Dalmases stated that Italian Adriano Baffi would likely win some of the flat stages.

Route and stages

While the start on Elba was announced on 9 October, the entire route for the 1993 Giro d'Italia was unveiled by race director Carmine Castellano on 14 November 1992. It contained three time trial events, all of which were individual. There were nine stages containing high mountains, of which five had summit finishes: stage 3, to Sella di Corno; stage 13, to Passo delle Erbe; stage 15, to Lumezzane; stage 17, to Chianale; and stage 20, to Oropa. Another stage with a mountain-top finish was stage 19, which consisted of a climbing time trial to village of Sestriere. The organizers chose to include one rest day. When compared to the previous year's race, the race was  shorter, contained one more rest day, more mountains, and lacked an opening time trial prologue. In addition, this race contained one fewer stage, but two more sets of half stages. For the first time since 1954, when live coverage began, the race was not broadcast by RAI. Instead it was broadcast by Reti Televisive Italiane (RTI) on the Italia 1 channel.

The race began with a split stage on the island of Elba, where Napoleon Bonaparte was exiled briefly in 1814. This was the first time the race began on the island of Elba. The race last visited in 1980 where the race finished in Portoferraio with a sprint finish won by Carmelo Barone. The route contained less time trials than the 1992 route, which Italian rider Claudio Chiappucci had requested. The race's fourteenth stage, which began and ended in Corvara, was named the queen stage for the amount of difficult mountains contained in the stage. Italian rider Franco Chioccioli liked that there were more points of attack in the race and believed that played into Miguel Induráin's hands.

Race overview

This edition of the Giro began with a split stage, with the morning leg consisting of an  undulating course and the afternoon stage being a brief  individual time trial. Moreno Argentin won the morning stage after attacking on the final climb of the day to win the leg by thirty-four seconds over the chasing peloton. The afternoon time trial navigated the streets of Portoferraio and was won by Italian Maurizio Fondriest. The Giro's second stage was relatively a flat route that culminated with a sprint finish which was won by Adriano Baffi. The next day saw the first uphill finish to the Selle di Corno. General classification hopeful Piotr Ugrumov positioned himself in the day's breakaway and attacked up the final climb to win the stage and climb to second overall.

The Giro's fourth stage ended with a sprint finish that was won by Italian Fabio Baldato. Jolly Componibili–Club 88's Dimitri Konyshev attacked in the closing kilometers of the fifth stage to take the win. The day of racing concluded with a sprint finish in Messina, which was won by Italian Guido Bontempi. Bjarne Riis, Giancarlo Perini, and Michele Coppolillo made up the leading breakaway as the race made its way into the stage seven finish in Agrigento. Riis and Coppolillo pulled away from Perini in the final seconds and Riis subsequently edged out Perini for the victory. The race's eighth leg came down to a sprint finish in Palermo, where Adriano Baffi bested the likes of Endrio Leoni and Fabio Baldato for the win.

The race's ninth stage began in Montelibretti after the race necessitated the transfer to the city during the rest day the day before. The two riders successfully fended off the chasing peloton and went on to the finish in Fabriano, where Furlan managed to beat out Chiesa for the victory. The stage 10 individual time trial began and ended in the city of Senigallia. Miguel Induráin dominated the course and gained over a minute on race leader Moreno Argentin, which allowed him to gain the overall lead of the race and don the race leader's maglia rosa.

Stage eleven was marred by rainy weather, which caused many splits in the peloton. Fabio Fontanelli won the stage as a member of the lead group, but tenth-place finisher Bruno Leali gained a six-second race lead by finishing more than three minutes in front of overall leader Miguel Induráin. The Giro's twelfth stage began with a large climb which led to many attacks. Despite the flurry of attacks, the whole peloton eventually made it to the finish line together for a sprint finish that was won by Russian Dimitri Konyshev.

The thirteenth stage saw the first stage that contained mountains from the Dolomites. On the penultimate climb of the day, the Passo di Eores, a lead group broke away that contained the likes of Andrew Hampsten, Ugrumov, and Massimiliano Lelli. The riders stayed out in front over the final climb of the Passi delle Erbe, but were eventually caught by the chase group containing the race leader Leoni. Moreno Argentin edged out Lelli for his second stage victory at the 1993 Giro d'Italia. The next day's route was even more demanding as it contained two ascents of the Passo Pordoi, as well as the climbing of three other highly categorized climbs. Miguel Induráin, Ugrumov, Claudio Chiappucci, and a few other general classification hopefuls were in the leading breakaway as they crossed the Pordoi for the second time. The group rode into the finish in Corvara with race leader Leoni trailing by several minutes. Chiappucci won the sprint to the line, while Indurain regained the overall lead.

Davide Cassani won the fifteenth stage that featured a summit finish to Lumezzane, while the general classification remained largely unaltered. The next day of racing saw a break from the mountains, with a primarily flat course that stretched from Varazze to Pontechianale. The stage ultimately finished with a bunch sprint that was won by Italian Fabio Baldato. The Giro's seventeenth stage concluded with a summit finish to Chianale. Marco Saligari won the stage by over a minute on the second-place finisher Gianluca Bortolami, while the general classification contenders finished together leaving the classification largely unchanged. Stage eighteen was a primarily flat stage that closed with a field sprint. Adriano Baffi won the field sprint and the stage, which was his third stage victory at the Giro that year.

Miguel Induráin won the leg and extended his lead over the rest of the field. The penultimate stage featured a  climb to Oropa. Second overall |Piotr Ugrumov attacked multiple times on the final climb of the day to gain time on Indurain; he attacked one last time and Indurain could not match his move. Massimo Ghirotto was the first rider to cross the finish line, with Ugrumov finishing in fifth and Indurain in tenth. Ugrumov gained 40 seconds on Indurain's lead, but it was not good enough to take it away from the Spaniard. The final stage was a primarily flat course that stretched from Biella to Milan. The leg culminated with a bunch sprint that was won by Italian Fabio Baldato. Indurain had won his second consecutive Giro d'Italia.
 
Success in stages was limited to nine of the competing teams, seven of which achieved multiple stage victories, while five individual riders won multiple stages. The riders that won more than once were Moreno Argentin in stages 1a and 13, Adriano Baffi in stages 2, 8, and 18, Fabio Baldato in stages 4, 16, and 21, Dimitri Konyshev in stages 5 and 12, and Miguel Induráin in stages 10 and 19.  won two stages with Moreno Argentin and stage 3 with Piotr Ugrumov. Ariostea won four stages, with Bjarne Riis in stage 7, Giorgio Furlan in stage 9, Davide Cassani in stage 15, and Marco Saligari stage 17.  won two stages with Miguel Induráin.  won three stages with Fabio Baldato. Jolly Componibili–Club 88 won two stages with Dimitri Konyshev.  won two stages, stage 6 with Guido Bontempi and stage 14 with Claudio Chiappucci.  also won multiple stages, with Fabiano Fontanelli in stage 11 and three stages with Adriano Baffi.

 and ZG Mobili each won one stage apiece. Maurizio Fondriest of Lampre-Polti won the stage 1b individual time trial, while ZG Mobili rider Massimo Ghirotto won the mountainous stage 20.

Classification leadership

Five different jerseys were worn during the 1993 Giro d'Italia. The leader of the general classification – calculated by adding the stage finish times of each rider, and allowing time bonuses for the first three finishers on mass-start stages – wore a pink jersey. This classification is the most important of the race, and its winner is considered as the winner of the Giro.

For the points classification, which awarded a purple (or cyclamen) jersey to its leader, cyclists were given points for finishing a stage in the top 15; additional points could also be won in intermediate sprints. Time bonuses were awarded to the riders who placed in the top three on flat stages, with first, second, and third receiving 12, 8, and 4, seconds bonus, respectively. The green jersey was awarded to the mountains classification leader. In this ranking, points were won by reaching the summit of a climb ahead of other cyclists. Each climb was ranked as either first, second or third category, with more points available for higher category climbs. The Cima Coppi, the race's highest point of elevation, awarded more points than the other first category climbs. The Cima Coppi for this Giro was the Passo Pordoi. The first rider to cross the Pordoi Pass was Spaniard Miguel Induráin. The white jersey was worn by the leader of young rider classification, a ranking decided the same way as the general classification, but only riders born after 1 January 1969 were eligible for it. The intergiro classification was marked by a blue jersey. The calculation for the intergiro is similar to that of the general classification, in each stage there is a midway point that the riders pass through a point and where their time is stopped. As the race goes on, their times compiled and the person with the lowest time is the leader of the intergiro classification and wears the blue jersey. For each intergiro sprint, the first three riders across the line would receive time bonuses of 6, 4, and 2 seconds, respectively. Although no jersey was awarded, there was also a classification for the teams, in which the stage finish times of the best three cyclists per team were added; the leading team was the one with the lowest total time. There was another team classification that awarded points to each team based on their riding's finishing position in every stage. The team with the highest total of points was the leader of the classification.

The rows in the following table correspond to the jerseys awarded after that stage was run.

Final standings

General classification

Points classification

Mountains classification

Young rider classification

Intergiro classification

Team classification

Team points classification

Aftermath

Miguel Induráin entered the Tour de France in July as the favorite to win the race. He would go on to win the race after taking the lead after the conclusion of the ninth stage. By winning the Tour, he became the first rider to complete the Giro – Tour double in two consecutive years. In April 2018, Indurain was placed into the Giro d'Italia Hall of Fame for his performances during the Giro d'Italia in his career. He was the sixth rider to be inducted.

References

Citations

 
1993
Giro d'Italia
Giro d'Italia
Giro d'Italia
Giro d'Italia